Tazehabad-e Sar Owriyeh (also Romanized as Tāzehābād-e Sar Owrīyeh and Tāzehābād-e Sarāvaryeh; also known as Tāzehābād) is a village in Badr Rural District, in the Central District of Qorveh County, Kurdistan Province, Iran. At the 2006 census, its population was 62, in 12 families. The village is populated by Kurds.

References 

Towns and villages in Qorveh County
Kurdish settlements in Kurdistan Province